Amir Dembo (born 25 October 1958, Haifa) is an Israeli-American mathematician, specializing in probability theory. He was elected a member of the National Academy of Sciences in 2022.

Biography
Dembo received  his bachelor's degree in electrical engineering in 1980 from the Technion.
He obtained in 1986 his doctorate in electrical engineering under the supervision of
David Malah with the thesis "Design of Digital FIR Filter Arrays". He joined Stanford University as Assistant Professor of Statistics and Mathematics in 1990, and is currently the Marjorie Mhoon Fair Professor in Quantitative Science there.

His research deals with probability theory and stochastic processes, the theory of large deviations, the spectral theory of random matrices, random walks, and interacting particle systems.

He was Invited Speaker with the talk Simple random covering, disconnection, late and favorite points at the ICM in Madrid in 2006. Dembo is a fellow of the Institute of Mathematical Statistics.

His doctoral students include Scott Sheffield and Jason P. Miller.

Selected publications

Articles
with Yuval Peres, Jay Rosen and Ofer Zeitouni: 
with Bjorn Poonen, Qi-Man Shao and Ofer Zeitouni: 
with Yuval Peres, Jay Rosen and Ofer Zeitouni:

Books
with Ofer Zeitouni: Large Deviations Techniques and Applications, Springer,

Sources
Zhan Shi: Problèmes de recouvrement et points exceptionnels pour la marche aléatoire et le mouvement brownien, d’après Dembo, Peres, Rosen, Zeitouni, Seminaire Bourbaki, No. 951, 2005

References

External links
Amir Dembo's home page, Stanford University

20th-century American mathematicians
Technion – Israel Institute of Technology alumni
1958 births
Living people
Israeli mathematicians
21st-century American mathematicians
Members of the United States National Academy of Sciences
Annals of Probability editors
Probability Theory and Related Fields editors